Sriram Balaji and Ramkumar Ramanathan were the defending champions but chose not to defend their title.

Michael Geerts and Joran Vliegen won the title after defeating Romain Arneodo and Albano Olivetti 6–4, 7–6(8–6) in the final.

Seeds

Draw

References

External links
 Main draw

Cassis Open Provence - Doubles